Prince Fedor Ivanovich Mstislavsky (died: 16 December 1622) was a Russian boyar, one of the leaders of the Duma aristocracy, leader of the Seven Boyars (who governed Russia for a brief period between 1610-1612) and the Chairman of Zemsky Sobor of 1613.

Biography 
Prince Mstislavsky became a public servant in 1575, and by the fall of next year he had become a boyar and led a regiment in his father's army. In the fall of 1579, the prince was briefly appointed as the governor of Novgorod.

After the exile of his father in 1586, he was appointed the member in the Duma, a position that he would keep for over 36 years and at the same time, became the highest-paid person in the Tsardom of Russia, with the income of 1200 rubles a year. He was once considered a candidate for the throne after the death of Tsar Fedor in 1598.

He led the government forces against False Dmitry I. After the impostor seized power, he was able to retain his position and influence. In 1606, he switched sides again and participated in the conspiracy against False Dmitry.

After the overthrow of Vasili IV in 1610, the political role of Mstislavsky increased. He led the Seven Boyars (1610-1612) and negotiated with the Poles. After the liberation of Moscow from the Poles, Mstislavsky participated in the election of Mikhail Romanov as tsar of Russia.

Fedor Mstislavsky died on December 16, 1622. The Mstislavsky family ended because all the children of Fedor had died in infancy.

References 

1622 deaths
Boyars
Time of Troubles